Isabella Hofmann (born December 11, 1958) is an American actress known for her portrayal of Kate in Dear John (1988–1992), Megan Russert in Homicide: Life on the Street (1994–1997), and Dr. Renee Dunseith in Providence (2001–2002).

Career
A native of Chicago, Hofmann attended East Troy High School in East Troy, Wisconsin, and Columbia College Chicago. She performed with the comedy troupe The Second City before breaking into television in 1986. Among her various television credits are Meredith Cavanaugh on JAG,  Kate McCarron on the NBC sitcom Dear John, Lt. Megan Russert in the crime drama Homicide: Life on the Street, and Cecile Malone on the Showtime comedy Beggars and Choosers. She played Annie in the 1990 movie Tripwire and Marie in the 1994 movie Renaissance Man.

Hofmann appeared twice in Season 7 of TV series Criminal Minds as David Rossi's first ex-wife Carolyn Baker. Hofmann appeared in a 2010 episode of NCIS (a spinoff of JAG) as the villainous Evelyn Wallace. In 2015, Hofmann landed a recurring role as Clarissa Stein, wife of Martin Stein (played by Victor Garber) in three episodes of The Flash, later reprising the role in two episodes of Legends of Tomorrow in 2016. She returned to the role in 2017 for the Arrowverse crossover event Crisis on Earth-X, appearing in part one (season 3, episode 8 of Supergirl) and part four (season 3, episode 8 of Legends).

Filmography
Film

Television

Video Games

External links

People from Chicago
Actresses from Chicago
American television actresses
Columbia College Chicago alumni
1958 births
Living people
20th-century American actresses
21st-century American actresses